Larry Kraft (born January 24, 1966) is an American politician serving in the Minnesota House of Representatives since 2023. A member of the Minnesota Democratic-Farmer-Labor Party (DFL), Kraft represents District 46A, which includes the city of St. Louis Park in the Twin Cities metropolitan area, and parts of Hennepin County in Minnesota.

Early life, education and career 
Kraft received both his bachelor's degree in computer science and his M.B.A from Cornell University.

Kraft has served in many capacities for the city of St. Louis Park, including as a city council member, environment and sustainability commissioner and a member of the climate action plan committee and the steering committee for St. Louis Park arts and culture strategic framework development.

Minnesota House of Representatives 
Kraft was first elected to the Minnesota House of Representatives in 2022, after redistricting and the retirement of DFL incumbent Ryan Winkler who unsuccessfully ran for Hennepin County Attorney. Kraft serves as vice-chair of the Climate and Energy Finance and Policy Committee and sits on the Commerce Finance and Policy, Sustainable Infrastructure Policy, and Transportation Finance and Policy Committees.

Electoral history

Personal life 
Kraft lives in St. Louis Park, Minnesota  with his wife, Lauri, and has two children.

References

External links 

Members of the Minnesota House of Representatives

1966 births
Living people
Cornell University alumni